Enkarterri (Spanish: Las Encartaciones) is a comarca of the province of Biscay, in the Basque Country, Spain. It is one of the seven eskualdeak/comarcas or districts that make up the province of Biscay. Its administrative centre is Balmaseda.

Historically a larger region (merindad), Enkarterri stretched from the mountains that form its southern border with Cantabria and Castile-Leon in the west and south, to the river Nervion and the Estuary of Bilbao in the east – including the industrial municipalities of Gallarta, Muskiz, Ortuella, Portugalete, Santurtzi, Sestao, Trapagaran and Zierbena. Nowadays the name usually refers only to the rural western part of the historical territory, while the eastern urban area is known as the Left Bank (Margen Izquierda / Ezkerraldea) and is part of the Greater Bilbao comarca (together with Barakaldo, which used to belong to the neighbouring merindad of Uribe).

Geography 

Enkarterri is located at the northwest of the province of Biscay. It borders the community of Cantabria to the west, and the Province of Burgos (Castile and León) and the province of Álava, also in the Basque Country, to the south. The river Kadagua crosses the region and drains most of it.

Municipalities

External links
 Official regional web site (in Basque and Spanish)

Comarcas of Biscay